Ultimate Comics: X-Men  was an ongoing monthly comic-book series published by Marvel Comics. It made its debut in September 2011 as part of the second re-launch of "Ultimate Marvel", though was canceled in 2013. Through the "Ultimate Universe Reborn" tagline following the "Death of Spider-Man", and written by Nick Spencer with art by Paco Medina, the series serves as a continuation of earlier titles such as Ultimate X-Men, Ultimate Comics: X, and the Ultimate Comics: Fallout mini-series. This title also exists alongside other relaunched Ultimate Marvel works, including Ultimate Comics: Spider-Man and Ultimate Comics: Ultimates.

Publication preview
It was announced in May 2011 that Ultimate X-Men would be re-launched under the "Ultimate Comics Universe Reborn" tagline. Written by Nick Spencer, and illustrated by Paco Medina, the title was called Ultimate Comics: X-Men. Announced members of the X-Men included Jimmy Hudson, Kitty Pryde (returning from her departure to appear in Ultimate Spider-Man), Iceman, Rogue, and Johnny Storm (formerly of the Fantastic Four). The story also apparently expanded upon Ultimate Origins’ revelation of the mutant race actually being the result of a government bio-experiment. The first issue was released in September, along with the new re-launch of Ultimate Comics: Spider-Man and after the releases of Ultimate Comics: Fallout, Ultimate Comics: Ultimates, and Ultimate Comics: Hawkeye.

"As a result of Magneto's attack that we saw in Ultimatum, the government has taken a much more aggressive stance," Spencer said during an interview. "We're really in a Days of Future Past-type scenario." As revealed in Ultimate Origins, mutants in the Ultimate Universe are not the next step in evolution, but instead a super-soldier attempt gone wrong. Spencer said that "information is going to go public, and the entire world is going to learn that the government created mutants."

Marvel editor-in-chief Axel Alonso also suggested a possible future crossover between Ultimate Comics: Ultimates, and whatever form the Ultimate Comics: Spider-Man series takes after Death of Spider-Man. Spencer also told Newsarama that it's a liberating feeling to be writing an X-Men comic in a world where Cyclops, Wolverine, Professor Charles Xavier, and Magneto are all dead. I think it's what makes it more exciting. These kids are living in a world where the legends are dead. This is more than just 'the dream is dead,' this is, 'both sides of the argument are dead.' That is just so much more fascinating. To me, what was really intriguing to me about where they were now is just in that. These kids have heard both sides, and seen both sides fail miserably. A lot of X-books have been built around that idea, that we're just one step away from everything going to Hell, and in the Ultimate Universe, that's happened. We're there. It's too late to put the genie back in the bottle. This relationship between humans and mutants is not going to repair itself.

Contributors
This list only includes comics already released.

Writers
Nick Spencer (#s 1–12; 2011–2012)
Brian Wood (#s 13–33, 18.1; 2012–2013)

Artists
Paco Medina (#s 1–6; 2011–2012)
Carlo Barberi (#s 6–8; 2012)
Paco Medina (#s 9–16; 2012)
Reilly Brown (#s 13–14; 2012)
Carlo Barberi (#s 16–23; 2012–2013)
Filipe Andrade (# 18.1; 2012)
Mahmud Asrar (#s 24–28; 2013)
Alvaro Martinez (#s 29–33; 2013)

Plot

Ultimate Comics: X-Men by Nick Spencer Vol. 1

Karen Grant visits the home of a young mutant named Chelsea Pleasant hoping to bring her under her guidance and protection. However, her father murders Chelsea in her sleep.

Valerie Cooper addresses the media regarding the recently released news that Mutants are being man-made at an American-funded lab based in Canada using experiments on a Mutant known as Wolverine. She states that conditions within the Mutant Internment Camps are good and, in some cases, better for some of the inmates compared to their lives before being detained. Jimmy Hudson, hearing the news about his biological father, decides to abandon both Liz Allan and Derek Morgan and travel to Canada to investigate further.

As the President of the United States also watches the news conference, he talks with Nick Fury about the situation involving Mutants and the riots. They are interrupted by Quicksilver who offers his assistance to the President, against Fury's better judgement.

Meanwhile, Rogue is being hunted by a Nimrod Model Sentinel, the government's newly created Mutant-hunting machine. The story makes its way to the Daily Bugle website where Bobby discovers it through his internet-enabled device. Both he and Johnny convince Kitty that they need to rescue her.

In the Upper West Side of New York, Jimmy Hudson is brought, unconscious, to Reverend Stryker by one of his followers. He states that he is doing God's work.

At Union Square Park Rogue is facing down the Nimrod Model Sentinels that are pursuing her when Shroud, Iceman, and Human Torch intervene. The Sentinels identify the Mutants, excluding Johnny, and give them an opportunity to surrender. Johnny, not being a target, attacks one of them causing little-to-no damage. Kitty then attempts to phase through one of them, to disrupt their circuits, but a force field prevents this. The Sentinels shatters Iceman's arms as he attempts to attack them. Johnny grabs Bobby and flees while Kitty cleverly phases through the ground and emerges at Rogue's location and retrieves her. A train bears down on them, but they phase right through it and hitch a ride away from the area. The group meets on a building rooftop. Kitty attempts to scold Rogue, but Rogue claims that she is doing God's work and that he spoke to her, giving her instructions, and predicting that Kitty and the rest would save her.

Elsewhere, Stryker is questioning Elise Cartwright about the nine mutant children for whom she has been providing refuge. She refuses to cooperate so Stryker kills her. One of his men enters and claims that he found the children exactly where Stryker said they would be. Stryker states that God informed him of the children's location.

Valerie Cooper enters the White House to meet with the President when she sees Nick Fury leave in a hurry. She finds Pietro Lehnsherr sitting with the President and he introduces himself. They discuss White House security measures against possible mutant attacks, when Pietro mentions that he has a plan involving Cerebro.

Reverend Stryker prepares for an attack and his men state that they are in position.

In the Morlock Tunnels, Iceman, Human Torch, The Shroud, and Rogue come across a little boy with a slug-like creature protruding from his back. The boy reveals that he is a mutant and that the creature is his brother, Joshua. He asks if they can help his friend, Jimmy, who has been severely injured. He tells them that they were both imprisoned by Stryker and Jimmy helped him, and all the other captured mutants, escape. Though most of them were shot and killed, the boy managed to escape with Jimmy, but not before Jimmy, himself, was riddled with bullets. Later, when Jimmy wakes up, he tries to convince the group that they have to stop Stryker before he does something horrible.

Stryker orders the attack and his snipers, positioned in New York City, Washington, D.C., and Chicago, kill human law officials. He reveals himself and states that everyone must heed the word of the lord.

Several months earlier, after Magneto's attack on New York, William Stryker lead an attack on Xavier's School, resulting in the death of several of his men and young mutants. Afterward, in a nearby forest, Stryker is seemingly approached by his father, William Stryker, Sr. He tells his son to be a man and to follow God's will. Some time later, Stryker enters a tent at a camp set up for anti-mutant militia to speak.

At the White House, the President converses with Quicksilver and Valerie Cooper about the implementation of Cerebra, Pietro's upgraded version of Cerebro. They are interrupted by Philip who turns on the news, revealing the killings by Stryker taking place in Times Square. There, Stryker's men bring truckloads of young mutants in shackles. He intends to show the world what he plans to do with them.

In the Morlock Tunnels, Kitty, Johnny, Jimmy and Bobby argue over whether or not to help the mutants. Kitty states that it is a bad idea, informing them that Peter would want them to stay safe. Johnny, taking offense at her using Peter to settle the argument, brings up the fact that she was nowhere to be seen during the battle with Norman Osborn that resulted in Peter being killed. Kitty punches Johnny and walks away. They head out on their mission to take Stryker down. Upset, Kitty speaks with the young mutant who brought Jimmy to them earlier. He tells her that Rogue is friends with Stryker. Rogue approached Stryker a while ago, asking for mercy. She intends to lead the others into a trap.

In a flashback to seventeen years ago, young William Stryker is ridiculed by his father for being weak. His father tells him that if he follows his orders he will make him strong. Now, in Times Square, Stryker's men bring before him a young mutant who is covered in thick scales. He speaks of how mutant camps are a waste of resources and that the mutants should be, instead, brought to him. He then touches the young boy on his forehead and his scales immediately fall to the ground. The boy seems to no longer be a mutant. The boy is angry with Stryker for what he has done to him. Stryker uses his blade to kill the boy.

In the White House, Valerie Cooper is talking with Quicksilver and the President of the United States about Cerebra. Pietro convinces the President that using Cerebra to guide the Nimrod Sentinels will make the public view him as a true hero in these hard times. The President excuses Valerie. She asks her assistant, Philip, to retrieve for her as much info as she can on both Pietro and Stryker, the latter being more important.

Stryker is about to demonstrate his mercy on another young mutant when Jimmy Hudson, Iceman, Human Torch and Rogue appear and warn him to let her go. Stryker reveals that Rogue is his ally and she immediately subdues both Johnny and Bobby using Bobby's absorbed powers. Stryker, two weeks prior, promised Rogue to free her of her mutant abilities if she brought the others to him. Stryker readies to kill Jimmy but Rogue demands that he fulfill his side of their deal before he lays a hand on them. He is about to heal her when the Shroud arrives and punches Stryker, knocking him to the ground.

At the White House, Pietro uses Cerebra to locate every mutant in the entire world. The President launches the Nimrod Sentinels and Pietro uploads the mutant's locations to them. Valerie discovers that Stryker is really a mutant and that when he was a boy his father kept him doped up and convinced him he was just ill so that he would not find out. She warns Pietro and the President and states that Stryker's gift is the ability to control machines. As the Sentinels near it becomes apparent that they are now under his control.

Rogue checks on Reverend Stryker and discovers that Kitty's hit killed him. Kitty readies to attack Rogue for her betrayal, but the Nimrod Model Sentinels attack them and the other mutants. When they are about to unleash their full attack which would normally kill everyone in the vicinity, Kitty gets the idea to have everyone hold on to her and the attack phases through all of them, except for one unfortunate young mutant. After the attack the Sentinels fly off in search of other targets.

Back in the Morlock Tunnels Kitty confronts Rogue about her betrayal but Rogue reveals that she had a plan to get Stryker to trust her enough to allow her to touch him when he attempts to "heal" her. She was going to take his ability and use it on him, rendering him powerless. She also states that she was told by god that they need to go to the S.E.A.R. Suddenly, they are interrupted by an apparition of a man calling himself the Oracle of Change, telling them to come to Tian, formerly known as the S.E.A.R.. Rogue reveals that the man she was referring to as god, the man who told her about Tian and how to take down Stryker, was none other than Charles Xavier, who visited her in a church three weeks earlier.

Ultimate Comics: X-Men by Nick Spencer Vol. 2
In later issues, there is an uprising in mutant reservation Camp Angel, where Colossus is freed. The book goes on to describe Kitty Pryde and her companions' journey west to deal with Stryker's sentinels.

Ultimate Comics Divided We Fall, United We Stand
After the battle and the end of the Sentinel threat, Kitty Pryde meets with the now President Captain America. He wants to put them in internment camps. Kitty disagrees with this course of action and they part ways.

Ultimate Comics X-Men by Brian Wood Vol. 1
Ultimately, most of the mutants in the United States take the cure. Kitty Pryde and a band of about twenty mutants, including Jimmy Hudson, Rogue, Storm, and Mach Two, rebel. Mach Two challenges Kitty's leadership but the group votes to place her in that position. Mach Two continues to plot secretly to undermine Kitty's leadership position. Kitty and Jimmy form a romantic relationship. The land on the reservation is irradiated, but mutants Storm, Zero, and Blackheath are able to create a mutant seed that can grow in any environment.

Characters

 Kitty Pryde/Shroud: After the events of Ultimatum, Kitty Pryde moved back home with her mother in Queens and took up the new mantle of "Shroud". She had been appearing regularly in Ultimate Comics: Spider-Man, and even made an appearance in Ultimate Comics: X when she found Wolverine's son Jimmy and helped him discover his mutant gifts. She is considered to be the leader of the team. She now is leader of a domestic terrorist group fighting to protect the lives of mutants after the government decided to let the Sentinels take control of the Southwestern states.
 Bobby Drake/Iceman: After being kicked out of his own house following Ultimatum, Bobby Drake was able to live temporarily with Peter Parker and pass as one of his cousins. He was there for the final battle against Norman Osborn which resulted in Spider-Man's death, and was announced as part of the new X-Men team. He eventually begins a relationship with Husk, and after another fight between Nomi and Kitty in Utopia, leaves with Nomi's sect of mutants and Husk.
 Marian Carlyle/Rogue: Hiding ever since the events of Ultimatum, Marian has been hearing voices recently that she believe somehow come from 'God'.
 Jimmy Hudson: After discovering his mutant powers for the first time, and meeting Kitty Pryde, Jimmy Hudson (the son of Wolverine), joined Karen Grant/Jean Grey's team and starred in Ultimate Comics: X, though in the end he decides to leave this team in search for answers about his father.
 Husk: A mutant from the Southwest who was imprisoned in a government camp before being rescued by Kitty and co.

Supporting cast
 Johnny Storm/Human Torch: After the disbanding of the Fantastic Four, Johnny Storm also went to live with best friend Peter Parker, passing as one of his cousins along with Iceman. He participated in the climactic battle against Norman Osborn, and was with Peter in his last few moments. He was also announced as part of the new X-Men team, despite not actually being a mutant. Kitty offers to let Johnny join her group, but he refuses because though he loves his group, he can not put his life on the line for a cause he is not a part of, or fully comprehend. Also, he did not like the idea of leaving the group of mutant kids to fend for themselves while they are fighting a war. He states that he is staying behind to watch over the kids. He is last seen being pulled out of a manhole in poor condition.
 Pietro Lensherr/Quicksilver: Former member of the Brotherhood of Mutants, the Ultimates, and the son of  Magneto. It is unclear what his exact motives are now.
 Wanda Lensherr/Scarlet Witch: Former member of the Brotherhood of Mutants, the Ultimates, and the daughter of  Magneto, revealed to be alive in Ultimate Comics: X.
 Valerie Cooper: Special Liaison to the President on Superhuman & Mutant Affairs.
 Ultimate X: S.H.I.E.L.D.'s new covert mutant team that includes Karen Grant, a.k.a. Jean Grey, Liz Allan, a.k.a. Firestar, Derek Morgan a.k.a. The Guardian, and Bruce Banner, a.k.a. The Hulk. Jimmy Hudson leaves this team just prior to them undertaking a mission in the S.E.A.R. (South East Asian Republic) in the Ultimate Comics: Hawkeye miniseries.

Enemies
With respect to the threats, Spencer’s comments include "the government for one. It's hunting season. The means of hunting has become significantly more effective Sentinels known as Nimrods. Pretenders to Magneto's throne will be in legion. Also a major adversary will rise up on the other side of the globe as the series' major Big Bad". Reverend William Stryker and the Purifiers eventually appeared to be the main adversaries as they launched a major attack on the United States Government after learning how they created mutants.

Collected editions
Ultimate Comics: X-Men has been collected in the following trade paperbacks:

References

X-Men (Ultimate)
X-Men
Widescreen comics
X-Men titles

fr:Ultimate Comics: X-Men